Prymnotomis is a genus of moths in the family Alucitidae. It was described by Edward Meyrick in 1931, and contains the single species Prymnotomis crypsicroca. It is found in Brazil.

References

Monotypic moth genera
Ditrysia genera
Alucitidae